is a Japanese manga series written and illustrated by Daiki Ihara. It was serialized in Weekly Shōnen Jump from November 2021 to June 2022. As of August 2022, its chapters have been collected into three tankōbon volumes.

Publication
Written and illustrated by Daiki Ihara, Protect Me, Shugomaru! was serialized in Weekly Shōnen Jump from November 22, 2021, to June 6, 2022. The first tankōbon volume was released on April 4, 2022. As of June 2022, the series' individual chapters have been collected into two tankōbon volumes.

Viz Media and Manga Plus are publishing chapters of the series simultaneously with the Japanese release.

Volume list

Reception
Steven Blackburn from Screen Rant criticized the series, stating the series is unoriginal and had little long-term sustainability.

References

External links
  
 

Comedy anime and manga
Shōnen manga
Shueisha manga
Viz Media manga